Johnson Peak is a low mountain,  high, which forms the western part of the Hart Hills in Antarctica. It was named by the Advisory Committee on Antarctic Names in 1982 after Robert J.R. Johnson, a newspaper correspondent attached to the United States Antarctic Research Program Pagano Nunatak – Hart Hills expedition of 1964–65.

See also
 Mountains in Antarctica

References

Mountains of Ellsworth Land